NGC 4183 is a spiral galaxy with a faint core and an open spiral structure located about 55 million light-years from the Sun. Spanning about eighty thousand light-years, it appears in the constellation of Canes Venatici. NGC 4183 was observed for the first time by British astronomer William Herschel  on 14 January 1788.

The galaxy is part of the Ursa Major Cluster.

References

External links 
 

Unbarred spiral galaxies
17880114
4183
07222
38988
Ursa Major Cluster
Canes Venatici